Palo Negro  may refer to:
 Palo Negro, Santiago del Estero, a municipality in Argentina
 a vernacular name for the tree Dalbergia retusa